Walter Eich (27 May 1925 – 1 June 2018) was a Swiss football goalkeeper who played for Switzerland in the 1954 FIFA World Cup. He also played for FC Winterthur and BSC Young Boys. He died on 1 June 2018, aged 93 in Bern.

Honours
BSC Young Boys
Swiss Super League: 1956–57, 1957–58, 1958–59, 1959–60
Swiss Cup: 1952–53, 1957–58

References

1925 births
2018 deaths
Swiss men's footballers
Switzerland international footballers
Association football goalkeepers
BSC Young Boys players
1954 FIFA World Cup players
Swiss Super League players
Swiss football managers
BSC Young Boys managers